In: Sanity is an album by American jazz group The 360 Degree Music Experience led by drummer Beaver Harris and pianist Dave Burrell recorded in 1976 for the Italian Black Saint label.

Reception
The Allmusic review by Michael G. Nastos awarded the album four stars, calling it "Improvisational music with world music touches... An essential purchase for the adventurous listener".  The Rolling Stone Jazz and Blues Album Guide also gave it four stars. Musichound Jazz called it "one of their best albums": "Typically wide ranging, it includes one certified classic: 'Sahara,' in which a steel pan orchestra meets collective jazz improvisation."

Track listing
 "Tradewinds" (Dave Burrell) - 6:31 
 "In: Sanity Suite Part I: Skull Job" (Baver Harris) - 6:46 
 "In: Sanity Suite Part II: TM's Top" (Harris) - 4:25 
 "In: Sanity Suite Part III: Complete Operation" (Harris) - 18:42  
 "Open" (Harris)  21:30 
 "Full, Deep and Mellow" (Hamiet Bluiett) - 6:31 
 "Sahara" (Francis Haynes) - 9:15
Recorded at Generation Sound Studios in New York City on March 8 & 9, 1976

Personnel
Beaver Harris - drums
Dave Burrell - piano, organ, celeste
Keith Marks - flute
Azar Lawrence - tenor saxophone
Hamiet Bluiett - baritone saxophone, alto clarinet, flute
Cecil McBee - bass
Sunil Garg - sitar
Titos Sompa - conga
Steel Ensemble: Francis Haynes, Roger Sardinha, Coleridge Barbour, Alston Jack, Michael Sorzano, Lawrence McCarthy - steel drums (track 7)

References

Black Saint/Soul Note albums
Dave Burrell albums
1976 albums